The peacock fly (Callopistromyia annulipes) is a species of picture-winged flies in the genus Callopistromyia of the family Ulidiidae. They are native to and widespread across North America. This species has recently been introduced accidentally to Europe, and is known from Switzerland, Germany, the Netherlands, France, Slovenia, Slovakia, Hungary, Czechia, Austria, Belgium, Poland, Ukraine, Romania and Croatia.

Behaviour
Males and females posture and strut on rotting trees or logs with their wings raised vertically and pointed forward. The resemblance to a peacock's tail is enhanced by blue reflections.

References

External links
Valery A. Korneyev, Libor Dvořák, Elena P. Kameneva, 2014  New Records of Callopistromyia annulipes Macquart (Diptera: Ulidiidae: Otitinae: Myennidini) in Europe Ukrainska Entomofaunistyka 12/2014; 5(2):10.Researchgate

29.08.2016 - New record from Slovakia, Laco Tábi, Radošina (Čertova pec), det. RNDr. Vladimír Straka, pic.: http://www.fotonet.sk/?idp=131846

Ulidiidae
Insects described in 1855
Diptera of North America
Diptera of Europe
Taxa named by Pierre-Justin-Marie Macquart